SEF may refer to:

 Sankara Eye Foundation, a non-profit that works for eradicating curable blindness in India
 Serviço de Estrangeiros e Fronteiras, Portuguese Border and Alien Service
 Sinfonia Educational Foundation, the philanthropic arm of the Phi Mu Alpha Sinfonia Music Fraternity
 Small Enterprise Foundation, a microfinance institution operating primarily in the Limpopo province of South Africa
 South Eastern Freeway, a Freeway in Australia
 Special Emergency Force, A Saudi Arabian riot control and counter-terrorism force
 Spectral edge frequency, a measure used in signal processing
 Stadio Erinis & Filias, the Greek name for Peace and Friendship Stadium, an indoor sports arena in Athens
 Straits Exchange Foundation, a semi-official organization of Taiwan that deals with the business matters with China
 Supplementary eye fields, areas in the primate brain that are involved in planning and control of saccadic eye movements
 Swap Execution Facility, a platform for regulated trading and clearing of swaps to be required in the United States by the Dodd-Frank bill
 Swedish Elite Football
 Swedish Electricians' Union, a trade union in Sweden
 Seaford railway station (England), a railway station in Sussex, England

See also:

 Sef, Iran (disambiguation)
 Sef Gonzales, Asian-Australian murderer